Anthony Perruzza (born 1959 or 1960) is a Canadian politician who has served on Toronto City Council since 2006. He currently represents Ward 7 Humber River—Black Creek. Perruzza was a North York councillor from 1988 to 1990, and served in the Legislative Assembly of Ontario from 1990 to 1995 as a member of the New Democratic Party (NDP).

Early life

Perruzza moved to Canada at age nine, and was raised in a working-class family in North York. He attended York University in the 1980s.

Political career 
He first campaigned for the North York city council in a November 1984 by-election for the city's first ward. A newspaper report from the campaign lists him as a twenty-six-year-old businessman and part-time student. Perruzza supported property tax cuts and the creation of a local recreation centre. He lost to Mario Sergio in a crowded field of candidates.

School trustee

Perruzza campaigned for a seat on the Metro Toronto Separate School Board (Catholic school board) in the 1985 municipal election, and narrowly defeated incumbent trustee Tony Nigro to win Ward 15. Early newspaper reports actually indicated that Nigro was the winner, before the final polling data was received.

In February 1986, Perruzza informed the media that board members were secretly considering cutbacks of up to $4.7 million to school various programs. He said he was making the information available because "the public should be given an opportunity to voice their concerns before the cuts are made". Some trustees criticized his decision. Perruzza later spoke against a board decision to prevent public nurses from teaching sex education in separate schools, and urged Catholic grade schools to accept non-Catholic students, describing existing bans as discriminatory.

North York councillor

After serving one term as a trustee, Perruzza campaigned a second time for the North York City Council in the 1988 municipal election. The election was marked by an unusual controversy, as one of his opponents was caught trying to throw away 161 Perruzza election signs at York University at 3:30 in the morning. Perruzza was elected without difficulty in the city's fifth ward, and became the only New Democrat on the new council.

Perruzza criticized some development initiatives proposed by North York Mayor Mel Lastman, including a plan to build condominiums on land owned by York University. He accused his council colleagues of shirking their responsibility to provide affordable housing, and spoke against Lastman's effort to institute a mandatory fee for North York municipal candidates, describing the plan as a "price tag on democracy that will favor incumbents". He was appointed to the North York Board of Health in 1989.

In early 1990, Perruzza recommended that North York license and regulate its previously-illegal rooming houses and basement apartments. He argued that the city had an obligation to provide protection to tenants and improve living conditions, but could not do so as long as the dwellings had no legal status. He opposed an 8.4 per cent property tax increase in the same period, and suggested that the city transfer $11.7 million from its planned performing arts centre to make up the necessary operational funds. He argued that developers were being given tax breaks, while residents were required to contribute more at the onset of a recession.

Member of Provincial Parliament

Perruzza campaigned for the Ontario legislature in the 1990 provincial election, challenging Liberal incumbent Laureano Leone in Downsview. One of Perruzza's main campaign promises was to fight the decentralization of government services, which had resulted in the loss of more than 1,400 government jobs from the riding. He also called for market value property tax assessment in Toronto, so as to provide substantial tax reductions for many of his residents. Perruzza defeated Leone by over 5,000 votes as the NDP won the election and formed a majority government.

Perruzza's election to the provincial legislature meant that he was forced to relinquish his seat on council. He criticized North York councillors for choosing to appoint his replacement, rather than calling a by-election. When it became obvious that no by-election would take place, Perruzza called for Mike Foster to be appointed to his seat. The council instead chose Claudio Polsinelli, a defeated Liberal candidate. Some North York councillors accused Perruzza of billing the city for stationery and business cards for use in his provincial campaign. Perruzza denied this, acknowledging that he ordered a significant amount of paper in 1990 but saying that none of it went toward his provincial campaign.

Perruzza and fellow MPP George Mammoliti supported a fight led by community residents to rebuild the York Woods Library Theatre in 1992. The following year, he announced his support for a compromise Metro Toronto tax reform plan that reflected the interests of both downtown and North York residents. In 1994, he pushed for greater accountability in the social housing trade. Late in his term, Perruzza supported the construction of a new community centre on Jane Street near Grandravine.

On June 9, 1994, Perruzza was one of twelve New Democratic Party MPPs to vote against Bill 167, legislation that would have provided same-sex couples with rights and obligations (including family benefits) equal to opposite-sex common law couples. The NDP had officially endorsed the bill, but allowed the issue to be decided by "free vote". The bill was defeated by a vote of 68-59. If the twelve dissenting New Democratic Party MPPs had voted for the motion, it would have passed.

Perruzza held five parliamentary assistant positions between 1990 and 1995. The NDP lost the 1995 provincial election, and Perruzza was narrowly beaten by Liberal candidate Annamarie Castrilli in Downsview.

Return to municipal politics

Perruzza returned to municipal politics after his provincial defeat. With the amalgamation of North York into the City of Toronto, he campaigned for the new city's seventh ward council seat in the 1997 municipal election. He was endorsed by the Toronto Star newspaper, but finished fourth in the two-member ward.

He campaigned for Toronto City Council's redistributed eighth ward, which includes the Jane and Finch area, in the 2000 municipal election. He was endorsed by the Toronto Star, the Canadian Union of Public Employees and the Ontario Public Service Employees Union. He was narrowly defeated by Peter Li Preti.

Perruzza challenged Li Preti again in the 2003 municipal election, charging that his opponent was negligent in defending the rights of tenants. He was again endorsed by the Toronto Star. Li Preti was re-elected by a reduced margin.

Perruzza challenged Li Preti a third time in the 2006 municipal election. He called for a licensing system for landlords, and focused on community safety issues.

Several incidents occurred during advanced polling on the weekend of November 4–5, 2006, leading to Perruzza and Li Preti accusing one another of dirty campaigning and the breaking of numerous election and criminal laws. Among other claims, each candidate accused staff from the opposing campaign of interfering with elections staff, campaigning illegally at polling locations and intimidating their opponent's voters. No criminal charges were laid by police. However, in a completely unprecedented move, the City of Toronto hired off-duty police officers at a cost of approximately $23,200 to guard all 40 voting locations in the ward on election day to assure that voters would remain safe and free from harassment.

Perruzza defeated Li Preti on election day, winning the Ward Eight seat by a margin of about 5 per cent. He is an ally of Toronto Mayor David Miller, who was re-elected over challenger Jane Pitfield.

On council

After the election, Perruzza was appointed to serve on the Licensing and Standards Committee, the Toronto Transit Commission and the audit committee. He was also named vice-chair of the North York Community Council. Perruzza has reiterated his call for a licensing system for landlords, and supports increased public transit in Toronto's York Region. He openly supports LGBT rights, and has shown this in his support of The 519 Church Street Community Centre.

He formerly served on the 2010 to 2014 Executive Committee and was the Chair of the Community Development and Recreation Committee in 2013 and 2014.

Perruzza also sits as one of six City of Toronto representatives on the Toronto and Region Conservation Authority.

Electoral record

Electors could vote for two candidates. 
The percentages are determined in relation to the total number of votes.

Footnotes

External links

Year of birth missing (living people)
Living people
Italian emigrants to Canada
Ontario New Democratic Party MPPs
Toronto city councillors
York University alumni
Toronto Catholic District School Board trustees